Poor Christ of Bomba is a satire novel by Mongo Beti. It was published in 1956 as Le Pauvre Christ de Bomba.

Plot 
Set in the 1930s, the story is narrated by Dennis who is Father Drumont's house-boy. The story revolves around Father Drumont who established a parish in Bomba, a small village in southern Cameroon. It tells about how he strives to convert the natives to Christianity and encourage monogamy.

Characters 
 Father Drumont, a Catholic missionary. 

 Father Jean-Martin LeGuen, Father Drumont's assistant. 

 Raphael, a catechist and Father Drumont assistant in charge of the parish.

 Denis, the  narrator and Drumont's house-boy. 

 Zacharia, the parish cook.

 Vidal, a French colonial administrator of the region. 

 Catherine, Dennis' lover.

 Clementine, Zacharia's wife.

References 

1956 Cameroonian  novels
French-language novels